RHSC may stand for:

Reproductive Health Supplies Coalition
Royal Heraldry Society of Canada
Royal Hospital for Sick Children, Edinburgh, Scotland
Royal Hospital for Children, Glasgow, Scotland
“Red-Headed Stepchild”, used to describe unloved children from a spouse's former relationship